Natalie Munt (born 8 November 1977) is a badminton player from the United Kingdom who currently resides in London. She participated in the 2004 Summer Olympics partnering Robert Blair in the mixed doubles.

References

External links
BadmintonEngland Profile

1977 births
Living people
People from Hertford
English female badminton players
Badminton players at the 2004 Summer Olympics
Olympic badminton players of Great Britain